Jack Cunliffe (3 March 1921 – 5 February 1973) was an English professional rugby league footballer who played in the 1930s, 1940s, 1950s and 1960s. Jack Cunliffe  played for Wigan in four decades; he made his début for Wigan on Saturday 9 December 1939, and he played his last match for Wigan on Saturday 9 January 1960 (a record that is unlikely to be equaled within rugby league).

Playing career

International honours
Jack Cunliffe won caps for England while at Wigan in 1949 against France, in 1950 against France (2 matches), and Wales, in 1951 against Other Nationalities, and Wales, in 1956 against France, won caps for British Empire XIII while at Wigan in 1952 against New Zealand, and won caps for Great Britain while at Wigan in 1950 against Australia and New Zealand, in 1951 against New Zealand, in 1954 against Australia.

Championship final appearances
Jack Cunliffe played in Wigan's victories in the Championship Finals during the 1945-46  season, 1946–47 season, 1949–50 season, 1951–52 season and 1959–60 season.

Challenge Cup Final appearances
Jack Cunliffe played in Wigan's 12-13 defeat by Wakefield Trinity in the 1945–46 Challenge Cup Final during the 1945–46 season at Wembley Stadium, London, played  in the 10-0 victory over Barrow in the 1950–51 Challenge Cup Final during the 1950-51 season Wembley Stadium, London on Saturday 5 May 1951, and played , and scored 2-goals in the 13-9 victory over Workington Town in the 1957–58 Challenge Cup Final during the 1957–58 season Wembley Stadium, London on Saturday 10 May 1958.

County League appearances
Jack Cunliffe played in Wigan's victories in the Lancashire County League during the 1945–46 season, 1946–47 season, 1949–50 season, 1951–52 season and 1958–59 season.

County Cup Final appearances
Jack Cunliffe played right-, i.e. number 3, in Wigan's 20-7 victory over Leigh in the 1949–50 Lancashire County Cup Final during the 1949–50 season at Wilderspool Stadium on Saturday 29 October 1949, played , and scored a try in the 28-5 victory over Warrington in the 1950–51 Lancashire County Cup Final during the 1950–51 season at Station Road, Swinton on Saturday 4 November 1950, played  in the 14-6 victory over Leigh in the 1951–52 Lancashire County Cup Final during the 1951–52 season at Station Road, Swinton on Saturday 27 October 1951, played  in the 8-16 defeat by St. Helens in the 1953–54 Lancashire County Cup Final during the 1953–54 season at Station Road, Swinton on Saturday 24 October 1953, and played , and scored a goal in the 8-13 defeat by Oldham in the 1957–58 Lancashire County Cup Final during the 1957–58 season at Station Road, Swinton on Saturday 19 October 1957.

References

External links
Statistics at wigan.rlfans.com
(archived by web.archive.org) Britain hold out Kiwis at Odsal

1921 births
1973 deaths
British Empire rugby league team players
England national rugby league team players
English rugby league players
Great Britain national rugby league team players
Rugby league players from Wigan
Rugby league centres
Rugby league five-eighths
Rugby league fullbacks
Rugby league halfbacks
Rugby league wingers
Wigan Warriors players